Matthew Nathaniel Teague (born October 22, 1958) is a former American football linebacker in the National Football League for the Atlanta Falcons. He was drafted by the Dallas Cowboys in the tenth round of the 1980 NFL Draft. He was also drafted by the Falcons in the seventh round of the 1980 NFL Supplemental Draft. He was also a member of the Ottawa Rough Riders, Toronto Argonauts and Saskatchewan Roughriders of the Canadian Football League. He played college football at Prairie View A&M University.

Early years
Teague attended Alcee Fortier High School in New Orleans, Louisiana, where he played mostly in the offensive line. He also practiced baseball.

He accepted football scholarship from Prairie View A&M University, where he became a four-year starter at left defensive end. His teams won only 12 games in 4 seasons, including going 0-11 in 1979.

Professional career

Dallas Cowboys
Teague was selected by the Dallas Cowboys in the tenth round (273rd overall) of the 1980 NFL Draft to play linebacker, as he was seen as an above average athlete.

Atlanta Falcons
He was selected by the Atlanta Falcons in the seventh round of the 1980 NFL Supplemental Draft, after his original selection by the Cowboys became invalid because of a college eligibility issue. On September 2, 1980, he was placed on the disabled list with an injured left knee he suffered in training camp. In 1981, he played in 11 games. On August 31, 1982, he was waived by the Atlanta Falcons.

Canadian Football League
On September 10, 1982, he was signed as a free agent by the Ottawa Rough Riders. On December 6, 1984, he was signed by the Saskatchewan Roughriders.

Los Angeles Raiders
In 1985, he was signed by the Los Angeles Raiders. He was released on July 25.

References

External links
Just Sports Stats

Living people
1958 births
Players of American football from New Orleans
Players of Canadian football from New Orleans
American football linebackers
Canadian football linebackers
American players of Canadian football
Prairie View A&M Panthers football players
Atlanta Falcons players
Ottawa Rough Riders players
Toronto Argonauts players
Saskatchewan Roughriders players
Los Angeles Raiders players